Thierry Queffelec (born 27 August 1962) is a French senior civil servant, former Administrator of Wallis and Futuna, and current Prefect of French Guiana.

Biography
Thierry Queffelec was born on 27 August 1962 in Thionville, France. He graduated from the Special Military School of Saint-Cyr.

In 1989, Queffelec was stationed with the United Nations Interim Force in South Lebanon, He also served in Rwanda in 1994, and in Beirut in 1997.

In 1998, Queffelec started to work for the Ministry of the Interior as Chief of Staff of the Vendée Prefecture. In 2005, he was appointed Secretary General of the Paris Prefecture.

On 7 January 2019, Queffelec was appointed Administrator Superior of Wallis and Futuna. and served in that capacity until 25 November 2020, when he was appointed Prefect of French Guiana.

References

1962 births
People from Thionville
Prefects of French Guiana
Administrator Superiors of Wallis and Futuna
French civil servants
French military officers
Living people
École Spéciale Militaire de Saint-Cyr alumni